Pendry is the surname of:
 Joe Pendry (born August 5, 1947), American football coach
 John Pendry (born 4 July 1943), English theoretical physicist
 John Pendry (hang glider pilot) (born 1957)
 Tom Pendry, Baron Pendry (1934–2023), English politician
 Jan-Simon Pendry, the original creator of the Berkeley Automounter